Dr. Christian Hockman House, also known as Chequers, is a historic home located near Edinburg, Shenandoah County, Virginia.  It was built in 1868, and is a two-story three bay square, Italian Villa style brick dwelling.  It features a prominent square central tower; wide, bracketed cornices, embellished with decorative scroll-sawn
friezes; and an elaborately detailed front verandah.

It was listed on the National Register of Historic Places in 1984.

References

Houses on the National Register of Historic Places in Virginia
Italianate architecture in Virginia
Houses completed in 1868
Houses in Shenandoah County, Virginia
National Register of Historic Places in Shenandoah County, Virginia